The Granby Telephone and Telegraph Co. of Mass. is an independent local telephone and internet service provider located in Western Massachusetts. The company is owned by Otelco and does business as OTT Communications.

Area code: 413

Exchange: 467

References

External links

1903 establishments in Massachusetts
American companies established in 1903
Otelco
Telecommunications companies based in Massachusetts
Telecommunications companies established in 1903
Telecommunications companies of the United States